Bahay is the word for "house" in the Tagalog language and other languages in the Philippines. Bahay can also refer to several barangays in the Philippines:

 Bahay, Abuyog, Leyte
 Bahay, Caramoan, Camarines Sur
 Bahay, Libmanan, Camarines Sur
 Bahay, Liloan, Southern Leyte
 Bahay, Pasacao, Camarines Sur
 Bahay, Pastrana, Leyte
 Bahay, San Jose, Camarines Sur
 Bahay, Santa Margarita, Samar
 Bahay, San Miguel, Leyte
 Bahay, San Policarpo, Eastern Samar
 Bahay, Sibonga, Cebu
 Bahay, Tarangnan, Samar